Denmark national cerebral palsy football team is the national cerebral football team for Denmark that represents the team in international competitions.  The team has never participated in the Paralympic Games but has been involved with several international tournaments.

Background 
The Danish Sports Organization for the Disabled manages the national team. In May 2013, an IFCPF coaching workshop was held in Austria.  It was attended by coaches from Austria, Singapore, Italy, Denmark and Jordan.  The goal was to develop coaches for both national and international level competitions. While Denmark was active in participating in international regional competitions by 2016, the country did not have a national championships to support national team player development.

Ranking 

Denmark was ranked eighteenth in the world by the IFCPF in 2016.  The team was ranked twenty-first in the world in August 2013 and November 2014. In July 2011 and September 2012, the team was ranked eighteenth.

Results 
The country has never participated in a Paralympic Games since the sport made its debut at the 1984 Games. Denmark has participated in a number of international tournaments. The team was scheduled to participate in the 2016 IFCPF Qualification Tournament World Championships in Vejen, Denmark in early August.  The tournament was part of the qualifying process for the 2017 IFCPF World Championships.  Other teams scheduled to participate included Scotland, Canada, Portugal, Iran, Northern Ireland, Australia, Venezuela, Japan, Republic of South Korea, Germany, and Spain.

References 

National cerebral palsy football teams
Parasports in Denmark
Denmark national football team